Source of the place names in the U.S. city of Chicago, Illinois.

References

Placename Etymologies
Placename Etymologies
Lists of United States placename etymology